Zionist political violence refers to politically motivated violence or terror perpetrated by Zionists. The term is used to describe violence committed by those who support the political movement of Zionism, and violence committed against opponents of Zionism. The violence often takes the form of terrorist attacks and has been directed against both Jewish and Arab targets. The most active period of most notable Zionist political violence began on June 30, 1924, through the 1940s, and continues to the present day, usually for the purpose of expanding Zionist settlements in Palestine. 

Notable examples of Zionist political violence include the King David Hotel bombing and the assassination of Yitzhak Rabin.

Impact

Actions were carried out by individuals and Jewish paramilitary groups such as the Irgun, the Lehi, the Haganah and the Palmach as part of a conflict between Jews, British authorities, and Palestinian Arabs, regarding land, immigration, and control over Palestine.

British soldiers and officials, United Nations personnel, Palestinian Arab fighters and civilians, and Jewish fighters and civilians were targets or victims of these actions. Domestic, commercial, and government property, infrastructure, and material have also been attacked.

Main occurrences

During the 1920 Nebi Musa riots, the 1921 Jaffa riots and the 1929 Palestine riots, Palestinian Arabs manifested hostility against Zionist immigration, which provoked the reaction of Jewish militias. In 1935, the Irgun, a Zionist underground military organization, split off from the Haganah. The Irgun were the armed expression of the nascent ideology of Revisionist Zionism founded by Ze'ev Jabotinsky. He expressed this ideology as "every Jew had the right to enter Palestine; only active retaliation would deter the Arab and the British; only Jewish armed force would ensure the Jewish state".

During the 1936–39 Arab revolt in Palestine, Palestinian Arabs fought for the end of the Mandate and the creation of an Arab state based on the whole of Palestine. They attacked both British and Jews as well as some Palestinian Arabs who supported a Pan-Arabism. Mainstream Zionists, represented by the Vaad Leumi and the Haganah, practiced the policy of Havlagah (restraint); Irgun militants did not follow this policy and called themselves "Havlagah breakers." The Irgun began bombing Palestinian Arab civilian targets in 1938. While the Palestinian Arabs were "carefully disarmed" by the British Mandatory authorities by 1939, the Zionists were not. As a conciliation to the Arabs, the White Paper of 1939 was passed, imposing significant limits in Jewish immigration in the shadow of World War II.

After the British Declaration of War in September 1939, the head of the Jewish Agency for Palestine David Ben-Gurion declared: 'We will fight the White Paper as if there is no war, and fight the war as if there is no White Paper.'; the Haganah and Irgun subsequently suspended their activity against the British in support of their war against Nazi Germany. However, the smaller Lehi continued anti-British attacks and direct action throughout the war. At that time, the British also supported the creation and the training of Palmach, as a unit that could withstand a German offensive in the area, with the consent of the Yishuv which saw an opportunity to get trained units and soldiers for the planned Jewish state and during 1944–1945, the most mainstream Jewish paramilitary organization, Haganah, cooperated with the British authorities against the Lehi and Etzel.

After World War II, between 1945 and the 29 November 1947 Partition vote, British soldiers and policemen were targeted by Irgun and Lehi. The Haganah and Palmach at first collaborated with the British against them, particularly during the Hunting Season, before actively joining them in the Jewish Resistance Movement, then finally choosing an official neutral position after 1946 while the Irgun and the Lehi continued their attacks against the British.

The Haganah, Irgun and Lehi also executed dozens of Jews for alleged treason or collaboration with Britain or Arabs, often after irregular drumhead court martials. 

The Haganah also carried out violent attacks in Palestine, such as the liberation of interned immigrants from the Atlit detainee camp, the bombing of the country's railroad network, sabotage raids on radar installations and bases of the British Palestine police. It continued to organize illegal immigration throughout the entire war.

In February 1947, the British announced that they would end the mandate and withdraw from Palestine and they asked for the arbitration of the United Nations. After the vote of the Partition Plan for Palestine on 30 November 1947, civil war broke out in Palestine. Jewish and Arab communities fought each other violently in campaigns of attacks, retaliations, and counter-retaliations which provoked around 800 deaths after two months. Arab volunteers entered Palestine to fight alongside the Palestinian Arabs. In April, 6 weeks before the termination of the Mandate, the Jewish militias launched wide operations to control the territory dedicated to them by the Partition Plan. Many atrocities occurred during this time. The Arab population in the mixed cities of Tiberias, Safed, Haifa and Jaffa, as well as Beisan and Acre and in the neighbouring villages, fled or were expelled during this period. During the Battle for Jerusalem (1948) where the Jewish community of 100,000 people was besieged, most Arab villages of the Tel Aviv – Jerusalem corridor were captured by Jewish militias and leveled.

At the beginning of the civil war, the Jewish militias organized several bombing attacks against civilians and military Arab targets. On 12 December, Irgun placed a car bomb opposite the Damascus Gate, killing 20 people. On 4 January 1948, the Lehi detonated a lorry bomb against the headquarters of the paramilitary Najjada located in Jaffa's Town Hall, killing 15 Arabs and injuring 80. During the night between 5 and 6 January, the Haganah bombed the Semiramis Hotel in Jerusalem that had been reported to hide Arab militiamen, killing 24 people. The next day, Irgun members in a stolen police van rolled a barrel bomb into a large group of civilians who were waiting for a bus by the Jaffa Gate, killing around 16. Another Irgun bomb went off in the Ramla market on February 18, killing 7 residents and injuring 45. On 28 February, the Palmah organised a bombing attack against a garage in Haifa, killing 30 people.

In 1995, Yitzhak Rabin was the Prime Minister of Israel who was assassinated by Yigal Amir after a peace rally. Amir had been opposed to Rabin's peace initiative, which included signing the Oslo Accords and withdrawing from the West Bank. He believed that Rabin was a rodef, meaning a "pursuer" who endangered Jewish lives, and that he was justified in removing Rabin as a threat to Jews in the territories according to the concept of din rodef ("law of the pursuer"), which is a part of traditional Jewish law.

Condemnation as terrorism

Irgun was described as a terrorist organization by the United Nations, British, and United States governments, and in media such as The New York Times newspaper, and by the Anglo-American Committee of Inquiry. In 1946, The World Zionist Congress strongly condemned terrorist activities in Palestine and "the shedding of innocent blood as a means of political warfare". Irgun was specifically condemned.

Menachem Begin was called a terrorist and a fascist by Albert Einstein and 27 other prominent Jewish intellectuals in a letter to the New York Times which was published on December 4, 1948. Specifically condemned was the participation of the Irgun in the Deir Yassin massacre:

"terrorist bands attacked this peaceful village, which was not a military objective in the fighting, killed most of its inhabitants – 240 men, women and children – and kept a few of them alive to parade as captives through the streets of Jerusalem."

The letter warns American Jews against supporting Begin's request for funding of his political party Herut, and ends with the warning:
"The discrepancies between the bold claims now being made by Begin and his party and their record of past performance in Palestine bear the imprint of no ordinary political party. This is the unmistakable stamp of a Fascist party for whom terrorism (against Jews, Arabs, and British alike), and misrepresentation are means, and a "Leader State" is the goal."

Lehi was described as a terrorist organization by the British authorities and United Nations mediator Ralph Bunche.

Jewish public opinion
During the conflict between Arabs and Jews in Palestine before the war, the criterion of "Purity of arms" was used to distinguish between the respective attitudes of the Irgun and Haganah towards Arabs, with the latter priding itself on its adherence to principle. The Jewish society in the British Mandate Palestine generally disapproved and denounced violent attacks both on grounds of moral rejection and political disagreement, stressing that terrorism is counter-productive in the Zionist quest for Jewish self-determination. Generally speaking, this precept requires that "weapons remain pure [and that] they are employed only in self-defence and [never] against innocent civilians and defenceless people". But if it "remained a central value in education" it was "rather vague and intentionally blurred" at the practical level.

In 1946, at a meeting held between the heads of the Haganah, David Ben-Gurion predicted a confrontation between the Arabs of Palestine and the Arab states. Concerning the "principle of purity of arms", he stressed that: "The end does not justify all means. Our war is based on moral grounds" and during the 1948 War, the Mapam, the political party affiliated to Palmach, asked "a strict observance of the Jewish Purity of arms to secure the moral character of [the] war". When he was later criticized by Mapam members for his attitude concerning the Arab refugee problem, Ben-Gurion reminded them of the Palestinian expulsion from Lydda and Ramle and the fact Palmah officers had been responsible for the "outrage that had encouraged the Arabs' flight made the party uncomfortable."

According to Avi Shlaim, this condemnation of the use of violence is one of the key features of 'the conventional Zionist account or old history' whose 'popular-heroic-moralistic version' is 'taught in Israeli schools and used extensively in the quest for legitimacy abroad'. Benny Morris adds that '[t]he Israelis' collective memory of fighters characterized by "purity of arms" is also undermined by the evidence of [the dozen cases] of rapes committed in conquered towns and villages.' According to him, 'after the 1948 war, the Israelis tended to hail the "purity of arms" of its militiamen and soldiers to contrast this with Arab barbarism, which on occasion expressed itself in the mutilation of captured Jewish corpses.' According to him, 'this reinforced the Israelis' positive self-image and helped them "sell" the new state abroad and (...) demonized the enemy'.

Some Israelis justify acts of political violence. Sixty years after participating in the assassination of Swedish diplomat Folke Bernadotte, Geulah Cohen had no regrets. As a broadcaster on Lehi's radio, she recalled the threats against Bernadotte in advance of the assassination. "I told him if you are not going to leave Jerusalem and go to your Stockholm, you won't be any more." Asked if it was right to assassinate Bernadotte, she replied, "There is no question about it. We would not have Jerusalem any more." In July 2006, the Menachem Begin Heritage Center organized a conference to mark the 60th anniversary of the King David Hotel bombing. The conference was attended by past and future Prime Minister Benjamin Netanyahu and former members of Irgun. The British Ambassador in Tel Aviv and the Consul-General in Jerusalem protested that a plaque commemorating the bombing stated "For reasons known only to the British, the hotel was not evacuated." Netanyahu, then chairman of Likud and Leader of the Opposition in the Knesset, opined that the bombing was a legitimate act with a military target, distinguishing it from an act of terror intended to harm civilians since Irgun sent warnings to evacuate the building. He said "Imagine that Hamas or Hizbullah would call the military headquarters in Tel Aviv and say, 'We have placed a bomb and we are asking you to evacuate the area.' They don't do that. That is the difference." The British Ambassador in Tel Aviv and the Consul-General in Jerusalem protested, saying "We do not think that it is right for an act of terrorism, which led to the loss of many lives, to be commemorated", and wrote to the Mayor of Jerusalem that such an "act of terror" could not be honored. The British government also demanded the removal of the plaque, pointing out that the statement on it accusing the British of failing to evacuate the hotel was untrue and "did not absolve those who planted the bomb." To prevent a diplomatic incident, changes were made in the plaque's text. The final English version says "Warning phone calls have been made to the hotel, The Palestine Post and the French Consulate, urging the hotel's occupants to leave immediately. The hotel was not evacuated and after 25 minutes the bombs exploded. To the Irgun's regret, 92 persons were killed."

Irgun, Haganah and Lehi attacks

June 30, 1924. Dutch Jew Jacob Israël de Haan was assassinated by Avraham Tehomi on the orders of Haganah leader Yitzhak Ben-Zvi for his anti-Zionist political activities and contacts with Arab leaders.
1937–1939 During the later stages of the 1936-1939 Arab Revolt in Mandatory Palestine The Irgun conducted a campaign of violence against Palestinian Arab civilians resulting in the deaths of at least 250. The group also killed a number of Jews it deemed guilty of "treason."
July 15, 1938* A bomb left in the vegetable market in Jerusalem by the Irgun injured 28.
July 25, 1938* The Irgun threw a bomb into the melon market in Haifa resulting in 49 deaths.
November 6, 1944 Lehi assassinated British minister Lord Moyne in Cairo, Kingdom of Egypt. The action was condemned by the Yishuv at the time, but the bodies of the assassins were brought home from Egypt in 1975 to a state funeral and burial on Mount Herzl.
1944–1945 The killings of several suspected collaborators with the Haganah and the British mandate government during the Hunting Season.
1946 Letter bombs sent to British officials, including foreign minister Ernst Bevin, by Lehi.
July 26, 1946 The bombing of British administrative headquarters at the King David Hotel, killing 91 people — 28 British, 41 Arab, 17 Jewish, and 5 others. Around 45 people were injured. In the literature about the practice and history of terrorism, it has been called one of the most lethal terrorist attacks of the 20th century.
1946 Railways and British military airfields were attacked several times.
October 31, 1946 The bombing by the Irgun of the British Embassy in Rome. Nearly half the building was destroyed and 3 people were injured.
April 16, 1947* An Irgun bomb placed at the Colonial Office in London failed to detonate.  The woman arrested for planting the bomb, alias "Esther," was identified as a Jewess claiming French nationality by the Scotland Yard unit investigating Jewish terrorist activities.  The attack was linked to the 1946 Rome embassy bombing.
 14 June 1947 The Reuters office in Tel Aviv was raided by "Jewish terrorists."
July 25, 1947 The Sergeants affair: When death sentences were passed on two Irgun members, the Irgun kidnapped Sgt. Clifford Martin and Sgt. Mervyn Paice and threatened to kill them in retaliation if the sentences were carried out. When the threat was ignored, the hostages were killed. Afterwards, their bodies were taken to an orange grove and left hanging by the neck from trees. An improvised explosive device was set. This went off when one of the bodies was cut down, seriously wounding a British officer.
December 1947 – March 1948 Numerous attacks on Palestinian Arabs in the context of civil war after the vote of the United Nations Partition Plan for Palestine.
1947 Letter bombs sent to the Truman White House by Lehi.
January 5–6, 1948 The Semiramis Hotel bombing, carried out by the Haganah (or, according to some sources, Irgun) resulted in the deaths of 24 to 26 people.
April 1948 The Deir Yassin massacre carried out by the Irgun and Lehi, killed between 107 and 120 Palestinian villagers, the estimate generally accepted by scholars.
September 17, 1948 Lehi assassination of the United Nations mediator Folke Bernadotte, whom Lehi accused of a pro-Arab stance during the cease-fire negotiations.

See also

Israeli settler violence
Kahanism
Jewish Defense League
Lehava
Jewish religious terrorism
Nationalism
Nationalist terrorism
Neo-Zionism
Palestinian political violence
Violence in the Israeli-Palestinian conflict
Jewish fundamentalism

References

Further reading

 online version at Internet Archive

Intercommunal conflict in Mandatory Palestine
 
Zionism
Terrorism in Mandatory Palestine
Judaism and violence
Jews and Judaism in Mandatory Palestine